Paramount Dairies Limited (PDL), often referred to as Paramount Dairies, is a dairy processing company in Uganda. PDL is a leading manufacturer of Cheddar and Gouda cheeses in Uganda. In 2013, the Daily Monitor newspaper named this company among the 6 key milk processors in the country, out of at least 30 licensed operators.

Location
The coordinates of the company headquarters and factory are:0°36'39.0"S,  30°40'29.0"E (Latitude:-0.610830; Longitude:30.674718).

Overview
PDL began as a family business in 1992, with installed capacity of 200 liters per day. As at 2011, the company employed over 50 personnel to produce 8 varieties of cheeses, which were sold to leading supermarket chains in Uganda's urban centers and to neighboring Rwanda. At that time, plans were underway to expand processing capacity to 100,000 liters per day.

Products
The include cheese and cream.

See also
List of milk processing companies in Uganda
Dairy industry in Uganda

References

External links
Opportunities and challenges in Uganda’s dairy industry

Dairy products companies of Uganda
1992 establishments in Uganda
Food and drink companies established in 1992